Il trionfo di Clelia is an Italian opera libretto by Metastasio originally written for Johann Adolf Hasse and premiered in Vienna in 1762. Among the many subsequent settings are the setting by Gluck that premiered in Bologna in 1763 and the setting by Josef Mysliveček that premiered in Turin in 1767.

References

External links
 

Libretti by Metastasio
1762 operas
Cultural depictions of Lucius Tarquinius Superbus
Cultural depictions of Cloelia